DNB ASA (formerly DnB NOR ASA) is Norway's largest financial services group with total combined assets of more than NOK 1.9 trillion and a market capitalisation NOK 164 billion as of 20 May 2016. DNB's head office is located in Oslo.

The two largest owners of DNB are the Norwegian Ministry of Trade and Industry (34.0%) and Sparebankstiftelsen DnB NOR (10.0%). The latter was created as a foundation with the sole purpose of owning part of the company. It was created when Gjensidige NOR was made a public limited company to ensure that the companies' customers retained partial ownership of the company. The foundation also can give up to 25% of its received dividend as gifts to charity.

Operations

The DNB Bank Group is the largest entity in the DNB Group and Norway's largest bank, offering services to the corporate, retail and securities markets and the public sector. Domestically, the group has an investment bank DNB Markets, the finance company Cresco, the real estate agency DNB Eiendom and DNB Asset Management, who operates as a fund manager for institutional clients in Norway and Sweden. DNB has the largest customer base in the Norwegian financial market. In Norway, DNB has more than 2.3 million retail customers and more than 200,000 corporate clients, with 61 branch offices.

The group's activities are primarily focused on Norway; however, it is one of the world's foremost shipping banks and a major international player in the energy sector. It has an international network of 27 branches and representative offices, including Helsinki (Finland), Copenhagen (Denmark), Hamburg (Germany), Luxembourg, London (United Kingdom), New York (United States), Houston (United States), Rio de Janeiro (Brazil), Santiago (Chile), Shanghai (China) and Singapore. The company also has multiple offices in Sweden.

In Denmark, Finland, Poland, Estonia, Latvia and Lithuania DNB used to market itself as DnB NORD in what was initially a joint venture with the German bank Norddeutsche Landesbank with DNB owning full stake since December 23, 2010. On November 11, 2011, the bank was rebranded and adopted the common DNB brand throughout these countries. In these countries, DNB has 930,000 customers and 163 Branch offices.

History
The history of the group goes back to 1822 with the establishment of Christiania Sparebank. The present corporation consists of mergers between Christiania Sparebank (1822), Gjensidige (1847), Bergens Privatbank (1855), Den norske Creditbank (1857), Fellesbanken (1920), Bergens Kreditbank (1928), Postbanken, Vital and Nordlandsbanken. The name DnB NOR was adopted in 2003, when the two banks Den norske Bank (DnB) and Gjensidige NOR merged in 2003. The company changed its legal name and brand to DNB in November 2011.

In August 2017, DNB and Nordea combined their operations in Estonia, Latvia and Lithuania to create Luminor Bank.

See also 

 List of oldest companies, which includes Gjensidige NOR

References

External links

 

 
Banks of Norway
Banks established in 1822
Companies based in Oslo
Companies listed on the Oslo Stock Exchange
Norwegian brands
Norwegian companies established in 1822